= San Jaime de la Frontera =

Coordinates: 30°20′S 58°19′W

San Jaime de la Frontera San Jaime
- Municipality and village
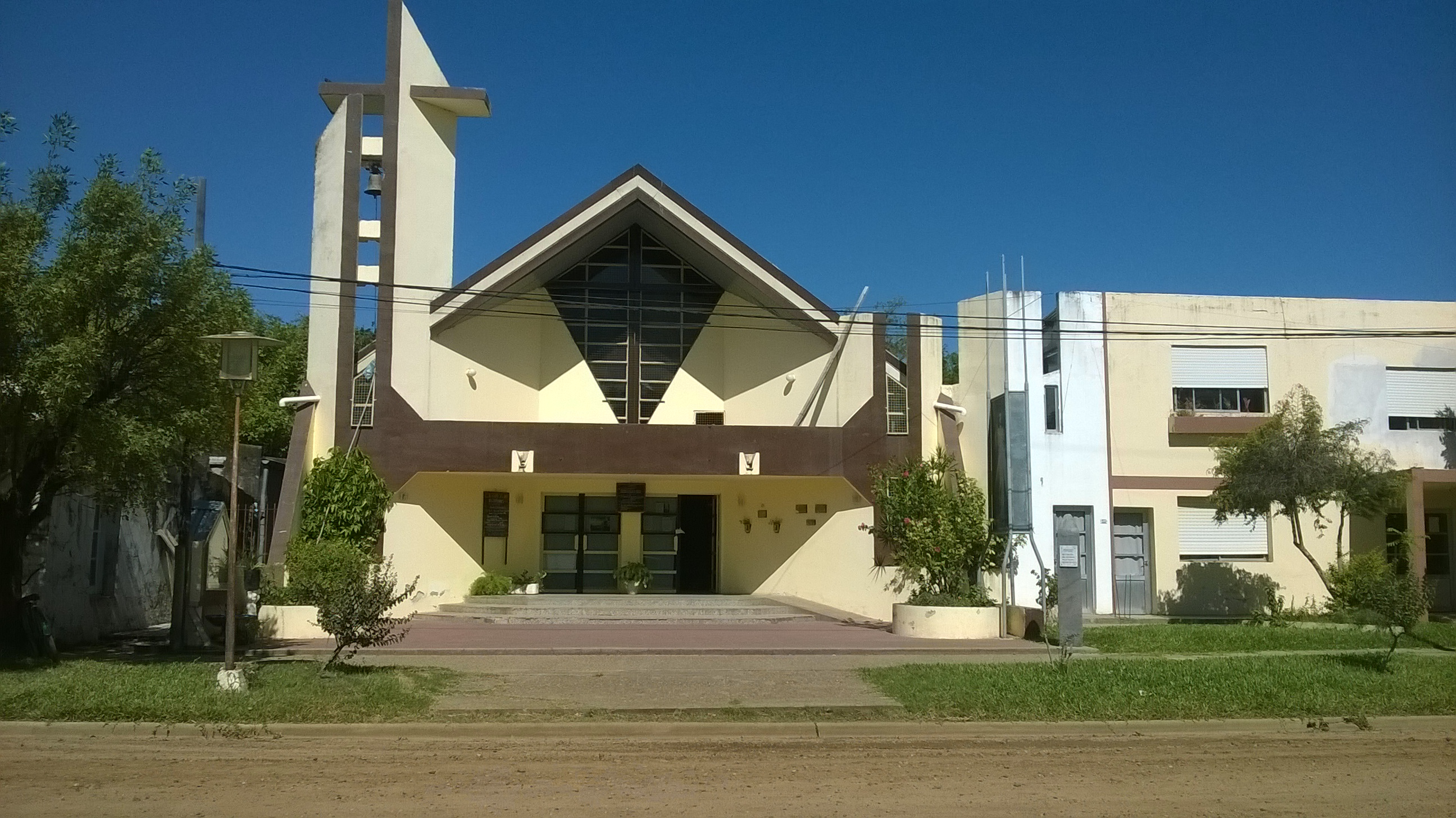
- Interactive map of San Jaime de la Frontera
- Country: Argentina
- Province: Entre Ríos
- Time zone: UTC−3 (ART)

San Jaime de la Frontera is a village and municipality in Entre Ríos Province in north-eastern Argentina.
